Taylor McDowell Mali (born March 28, 1965) is an American slam poet, humorist, teacher, and voiceover artist.

Life

A 12th-generation native of New York City, Taylor Mali graduated from the Collegiate School, a private school for boys, in 1983. He received a B.A. in English from Bowdoin College in 1987 and an M.A. in English/Creative Writing from Kansas State University in 1993. One of four children, his mother was children's book author Jane L. Mali, a recipient of the American Book Award, and his father was H. Allen Mali, vice president of Henry W.T. Mali & Co., manufacturers of pool table coverings. He is the great-great-grandson of John Taylor Johnston, founding president of the Metropolitan Museum of Art. He has married three times. His first wife was Rebecca Ruth Tauber (married in 1993; she died in 2004) and his second wife was Marie-Elizabeth Mundheim (married in 2006; they divorced in 2012).  On August 11, 2013, Mali married Rachel Kahan.  On January 2, 2015, he became a father to a baby boy, and in 2017 a baby girl.

On January 7, 2021, the New York Times wrote about his mission to retrieve plastic bags trapped in tree branches around his Brooklyn neighborhood, using a metal painters pole with a 21-foot extension, and comparing him to Don Quixote.

Poetry

As a slam poetry performer, Taylor Mali has been on seven National Poetry Slam teams; six appeared on the finals stage and four won the competition (1996 with Team Providence; 1997, 2000 and 2002 with Team NYC-Urbana). Mali is the author of What Learning Leaves and the Last Time as We Are (Write Bloody Publishing), has recorded four CDs, and is included in various anthologies. Poets who have influenced him include Billy Collins, Saul Williams, Walt Whitman, Rives, Mary Oliver, and Naomi Shihab Nye. He is perhaps best known for the poem "What Teachers Make." The popular poem became the basis of a book of essays, titled, "What Teachers Make: In Praise of the Greatest Job in the World" which was published in 2012 by Putnam Adult.

He appeared in Taylor Mali & Friends Live at the Bowery Poetry Club and the documentaries "SlamNation" (1997) and "Slam Planet" (2006). He was also in the HBO production, "Russell Simmons Presents Def Poetry," which won a Peabody Award in 2003. Taylor Mali is the former president of Poetry Slam Incorporated, and he has performed with such renowned poets as Billy Collins and Allen Ginsberg. Although he retired from the National Poetry Slam competition in 2005, he still helps curate the reading series Page Meets Stage, held monthly at the Bowery Poetry Club. His chapbook, The Whetting Stone, won the Rattle Chapbook Prize for 2017.

Teaching
Taylor Mali spent nine years teaching English, history, and math, including stints at Browning School, a boys' school on the Upper East Side of New York City, and Cape Cod Academy, a K-12 private school on Cape Cod, Massachusetts. He now lectures and conducts workshops for teachers and students all over the world. In 2001, Taylor Mali used a grant from the New York Foundation for the Arts to develop the one-man show "Teacher! Teacher!" about poetry, teaching, and math. He is a strong advocate for the nobility of teaching and in 2000 he set out to create 1,000 new teachers through "poetry, persuasion, perseverance, or passion."  He finally reached the mark on April 1, 2012.

Controversy 
In 2015, Melissa Lozada-Oliva performed the poem, "Like Totally Whatever (after Taylor Mali)" on the final stage of the National Poetry Slam in Oakland, as a rebuttal to Mali's famous poem, "Totally like whatever, you know?". Lozada-Oliva criticized Mali's piece for lacking context, such as how patriarchy impacts women's struggles to speak up. Lozada-Oliva's poem received thunderous applause and secured her team, the House Slam Boston, the championship title that year at NPS. Shortly after the competition, the poem was posted to Button Poetry, which made Lozada-Oliva go viral overnight.

Published works

Books
 What Teachers Make: In Praise of the Greatest Job in the World, 2012 - 
 The Last Time As We Are, 2009 - 
 What Learning Leaves, 2002 - 
The Whetting Stone, 2017 -

Audio CDs
 Icarus Airlines, 2007
 Conviction, 2003
 Poems from the Like Free Zone, 2000
 The Difference Between Left & Wrong, 1995

Anthologies
Collections in which Taylor Mali's work is included
 Poetry on Stage: At the Red Barn Theatre, Key West,  Danne Hughes, ed. 1995 
 Poetry Nation: The North American Anthology of Fusion Poetry, Regie Cabico & Todd Swift, eds. 1998, 
 Will Work For Peace: New Political Poems, Brett Axel, Ed. 1999, 
 Bearing Witness, Margaret Hatcher, ed. 2001, 
 Freedom to Speak Anthology, Patricia Smith & Debora Marsh eds 2002, 
 The Spoken Word Revolution  Mark Eleveld, ed. 2003,

CD Anthologies
Collections in which Taylor Mali's work is included
 Attack of the Urbanabots (The Wordsmith Press, 2007)
 New High Score (The Wordsmith Press, 2004)
 Writers Week IX (WWIX, 2004)
 Best of Urbana 2003 (The Wordsmith Press, 2003)
 The Kerfuffle Incident: Best of the Kalamazoo Poetry Slam (KPS, 2003)
 Urbana: Bowery Poetry Club (The Wordsmith Press, 2002)
 Freedom to Speak Anthology(CD) (The Wordsmith Press, 2002)
 Spoken Word Underground (The Wordsmith Press, 2001)
 NYC Slams (Anthology) (PoetCD, 2000)

Narration
 American Fairy Tales, audiobook, 1998
 Shipwreck at the Bottom of the World, audiobook, 2000
 Hope Along the Wind: The Story of Harry Hay, documentary, 2002
 Blizzard!, audiobook, 2003
 The Great Fire, audiobook, 2003
 Revenge of the Whale, audiobook, 2005
 ESCAPE! The Story of the Great Houdini, audiobook, 2006
 Close To Shore, audiobook, 2007

Awards
 1996, 1997, 2000, 2002 - National Poetry Slam winning team
 2001 - U. S. Comedy Arts Festival jury prize for best solo performance, "Teacher! Teacher!"
 2003 - AudioFile Earphones Award for The Great Fire.''

See also

 Performance poetry
 Poetry slam
 Spoken word
 Voice acting
 Bowery Poetry Club

References

External links

Taylor Mali profile, Famecast web site
Podcasts of poems
Watch Taylor Mali recite his poems at Open-Door Poetry
Audio of "What Teachers Make," "Like Lilly Like Wilson," "The Entire Act of Sorrow," "Depression Too Is a Kind of Fire," "Holding Your Position," "For the Life of Me," and "How To Write a Political Poem" (among others) on Indiefeed Performance Poetry Channel

YouTube videos
Mali posts videos on his channel at YouTube of his own and other performances:
 
 
 
 

Slam poets
Collegiate School (New York) alumni
Bowdoin College alumni
Living people
1965 births
American male voice actors
American male poets
American spoken word poets
Kansas State University alumni
Schoolteachers from New York (state)
Male actors from New York City
Educators from New York City
21st-century American poets
21st-century American male writers